Old Gray was an American emo band from Hooksett and Auburn, New Hampshire.

History
Old Gray began in 2011. The band was formed by Cameron Boucher, Charlie Singer, Zane McDaniel, and Raphael Bastek. In 2013, Boucher would form punk band Sorority Noise in which would later feature Singer. Due to the prominent rise in popularity of Sorority Noise, Old Gray would often have to take long periods of inactivity aside for some one-off shows. Since then, they have released two full-length albums, three EPs, six splits, and two singles. Their debut album, An Autobiography, was released in 2013. Their second full-length album, Slow Burn was released on December 9, 2016 via Boucher's Flower Girl Records.   

In April 2018, the band announced their final shows but cancelled them due to the mental well being of Boucher after a third party claimed they had sexually assaulted a friend of theirs. In December 2018, these claims were refuted in a joint post by both Boucher and the person involved, saying that "they were pressured into making this statement" and that "anything that did occur was not purposeful or malicious."

Members
Final line-up
Cameron Boucher - guitar, vocals, bass, and piano (2011–2018)
Charlie Singer - drums and spoken word (2011–2018)
Adam Ackerman - bass and vocals (2015–2018)
Past
Raphael Bastek - guitar, vocals, bass, and drums (2011-2014)
Zane McDaniel - bass (2011)

Timeline

Discography

Studio albums
An Autobiography (2013)
Slow Burn (2016)

EPs
Demo (2011)
Do I Dare Disturb The Universe (2011)
Everything I Let Go & The Things I Refuse To  (2012)
Dex (2015)

Splits
Old Gray & The Hundred Acre Woods - An Acoustic Split Among Friends (2011)
Old Gray / Girl Scouts (2011)
4-way V-Day split - The Hundred Acre Woods / Julia Brown / Modern Baseball / Old Gray (2013)
Old Gray / Tiny Moving Parts / Have Mercy / Unraveler (2013)
Dikembe / The Hotel Year / Modern Baseball / Old Gray / Empire! Empire! (I Was a Lonely Estate) / Pentimento (2013)
Old Gray / Tiny Moving Parts (2014)

Singles
""I Think I Might Love You" Is An Awfully Long Sentence" (2013)
"The Artist" (2013)
"Catharsis" (2011 demo) (2013)

References

Rock music groups from New Hampshire
American post-hardcore musical groups
American emo musical groups
American screamo musical groups